The Christmas Season Massacre is a 2001 horror comedy film written and directed by Jeremy Wallace, and co-written by Eric Stanze.

Plot 

On Christmas Eve, sometime after a woman is disemboweled in the woods of Christmastown, California by a man dressed as a pirate, a couple drive to a field, which the man, Boom Boom, claims is where Tommy "Oneshoe" McGroo buries his victims, the people who used to bully him. Boom Boom tells his girlfriend, Kitty, that Tommy acquired his nickname when one of his shoes was stolen, and he could not afford another due to his family's poverty. Tommy asked for replacement footwear for Christmas, but instead got an eyepatch with a Christmas tree on it, since he idolized pirates. Driven insane by this, Tommy began murdering his tormentors, though most consider him an urban legend. After telling Tommy's story, Boom Boom goes to urinate, and has his testicles ripped off by Tommy, who then wounds Kitty. Later, Tommy snaps the neck of man having kinky sex with his blindfolded wife, who Tommy then rapes.

At Lame Dog Hollow Camp, Tommy's remaining former classmates are assembled by Ernie Cunningham, who wants them to team-up to kill Tommy when he inevitably comes looking for them. Until then, the group members spend their time trying to amuse themselves, with amateur guitarist Isaac Hiltzik (who only talk sings) and his girlfriend, Lana Hooper, heading to the nearby lake, where Tommy knifes them. The next to die is awkward nerd Dorcas Cunningham, who Tommy sneaks up on with a running chainsaw, only being noticed when he steps on a twig.

After the sultry Abby Honeydew is stabbed while looking for their missing friends, Ernie and Danny make plans to try and summon Tommy's previous victims with a Ouija board, but Ernie is killed with a screwdriver while traversing a cemetery. Danny fights Tommy, and stabs him in the head with a rail spike, though Tommy recovers from this, blasts Danny with a shotgun, and takes one of his shoes. Five years later, Tommy (who still has the spike protruding from his head) is shown to have married the woman he had sex with, and the two have a son, who Tommy gives his eyepatch to as a Christmas present.

Cast 

 D.J. Vivona as Ernie Campbell
 Jason Christ as Dorcas Cunningham
 Chris Belt as Danny Carpenter
 Michael Hill as Tommy "Oneshoe" McGroo
 Joy Payne as Abby Honeydew
 Michael Wallace as Isaac Hiltzik
 Melissa Wallace as Lana Hooper
 Eric Stanze as Boom Boom/Clarence Melvin Schnortstein
 Kyokai Lee as Kinky Wife
 William Clifton as Kinky Husband
 David Dunn as Frightened Driver
 Julie Farrar as Kitty Olen
 Jamie Sandler as Gutted Victim
 Jake Wallace as Little Oneshoe McGroo
 Lisa Anne Harness as Radio Voice
 Billy Kryptonite as Hank

Reception 

The film was labeled "Mostly silly in a bad way, but worth a couple of chuckles if you're bored" by The Worldwide Celluloid Massacre. Digital Retribution found the film boring and mostly unfunny, concluding "As a holiday movie it's virtually worthless, and as a comedy/slasher it's not much better".

References

External links 

 

2000s Christmas horror films
2001 comedy horror films
2001 direct-to-video films
2001 films
2001 horror films
American Christmas horror films
American comedy horror films
American films about revenge
American independent films
American serial killer films
American slasher films
American splatter films
Slasher comedy films
BDSM in films
Direct-to-video horror films
Films about bullying
Films set in California
Films shot in Missouri
2001 comedy films
2000s English-language films
2000s American films